My Life Is a River is a Canadian documentary film, directed by Alain Chartrand and released in 1996. The film is a portrait of Chartrand's mother, labour unionist and human rights activist Simonne Monet-Chartrand.

The film is essentially a sequel to Un homme de parole, his 1991 film about his father Michel Chartrand. It was followed in 2000 by Chartrand et Simonne, his dramatic television miniseries about their relationship.

The film received a Genie Award nomination for Best Feature Length Documentary at the 17th Genie Awards.

References

External links
 

1996 films
1996 documentary films
Canadian documentary films
National Film Board of Canada documentaries
Quebec films
French-language Canadian films
1990s Canadian films